Éric Pierre Joseph Houde (born December 19, 1976) is a Canadian former professional ice hockey player who played 30 games in the National Hockey League for the Montreal Canadiens.

Career
Houde was drafted 216th overall by the Montreal Canadiens in the 1995 NHL Entry Draft and made his debut for the team during the 1996–97 NHL season, playing 13 games for Montreal.  He would play 17 more games over two seasons for a total of 30 games, scoring two goals and three assists for five points. Over the next two seasons, Houde had spells in the American Hockey League for the Hamilton Bulldogs and Springfield Falcons and the International Hockey League for the Utah Grizzlies and the Chicago Wolves. 

In 2001, Houde moved to Italy's Serie A for Asiago and then moved to Germany's Deutsche Eishockey Liga in 2002 with the SERC Wild Wings. He returned to Quebec in 2003, signing for the Verdun Dragons of the Quebec Semi-Pro Hockey League before returning to Europe, joining Swiss Nationalliga B side SC Langenthal.  

In 2004, Houde returned to Germany, spending three seasons in the 2nd Bundesliga for the Essen Mosquitoes and the Landshut Cannibals. He moved to France in 2007 with Dragons de Rouen.

Career statistics

External links

1976 births
Living people
Canadian ice hockey centres
Chicago Wolves players
Essen Mosquitoes players
EV Landshut players
Fredericton Canadiens players
French Quebecers
Halifax Mooseheads players
Hamilton Bulldogs (AHL) players
Asiago Hockey 1935 players
Ice hockey people from Montreal
SC Langenthal players
Montreal Canadiens draft picks
Montreal Canadiens players
Rouen HE 76 players
Saint-Jean Lynx players
Schwenninger Wild Wings players
Springfield Falcons players
Utah Grizzlies (IHL) players
Canadian expatriate ice hockey players in France
Canadian expatriate ice hockey players in Italy
Canadian expatriate ice hockey players in Germany